Lisa Bunker (born ) is an American politician who was elected to the New Hampshire House of Representatives in 2018. She represents the Rockingham 18th District as a member of the Democratic Party.

Bunker and Gerri Cannon were elected simultaneously as the state's first transgender state legislators.

Before her election to the legislature, Bunker was program director of a community radio station in Portland, Maine. In 2017, she published a middle-grade science fiction novel, Felix Yz, about a boy fused with an alien and the risky procedure to separate them. Her second middle-grade novel, Zenobia July (2019), is about a young trans girl finally living as herself and solving a cyber mystery. Both are published by Penguin Random House.

References

External links

Living people
Democratic Party members of the New Hampshire House of Representatives
LGBT state legislators in New Hampshire
American women novelists
Transgender politicians
Transgender women
21st-century American novelists
21st-century American women writers
21st-century American politicians
Women state legislators in New Hampshire
People from Exeter, New Hampshire
Year of birth missing (living people)
21st-century American women politicians
American transgender writers